Kazemian is a surname. Notable people with the surname include:

Javad Kazemian (born 1981), Iranian footballer
Sam Kazemian (born 1993), Iranian-American software programmer and co-founder and president of Everipedia